Abdul Majid Arfaee (Persian: , born 1 September 1939) is an Iranian researcher and elamitologist. He has finished translating 647 tablets, related to the era of Darius the Great, which were read by Richard Hallock. The works are included in the first volume of the series.

Richard Treadwell Hallock, Elamologist and Assyriologist, was a professor of Chicago University. The late professor, who read the bulk of the Persepolis Elamite tablets, died in 1980. Arfaee, the renowned expert of Elamite, Avestan and Pahlavi languages, is the founder of the Inscriptions Hall of Iran's National Museum and has written a number of books on Iranian history. The Iranian expert has also translated more than 2,500 Persepolis inscriptions, which are housed at Chicago University. In Iran, the Cyrus Cylinder has been translated into Persian, by Arfaee for the first time.

References

1939 births
Living people
Iranian archaeologists
Linguists from Iran
Iranian translators
University of Chicago faculty